Haspura old name Hanspura, is a block and town of Aurangabad district of Bihar, state in India.

Religions

References 

Cities and towns in Aurangabad district, Bihar
Villages in Aurangabad district, Bihar